Posledniy geroy, initially released in France as Le Dernier Des Héros, is an album by Soviet rock band Kino, which is a collection of re-recorded songs by the band. The album is notable for containing one of the band's most famous songs, "Khochu peremen!", which became a Perestroika anthem. The album was first released in France due to the band's newfound popularity abroad.

History 
Posledniy geroy was recorded in the studio of Valery Leontief in Moscow in January 1989, and was mixed in the Studio du Val d'Orge in the Paris suburb of Epinay sur Orge. At the same studio in November 1990, the Black Album was compiled. The release of the album was financed by Joel Bastener, cultural attaché of the Embassy of France in the USSR. The songs were chosen by Victor Tsoi himself: he decided to make a "Best of" album, and insisted that the album was made in France. Having recorded the material in Valery Leontief's studio, Tsoi gave it to Bastener for release. The album included songs from Gruppa krovi plus new versions of "Electrichka", "Trolleybus" and "Posledniy Geroy (The Last Hero)", as well as the famous composition "Hochu Peremen!" The album was released in France in April 1989 by Off The Track Records under the name Le Dernier Des Héros, alongside the single "Maman". It was named Последний герой upon its release in the USSR.

The design of the cover is based on the original collage of Victor Tsoi and Georgy Guryanov. During the album's work was the recording of the song "Blood Type" which was requested by an American fan as a translation to "Группа крови", was not included in the album. The song was released in the 2002 collection The Last Recordings along with the song "Question/Bicycle" and unreleased studio recordings of the songs "Knock", "Sadness" and others as well as a pun made by Victor Tsoi based in the band's name. In the 2000 remix album Victor Tsoi: Sadness, the vocals were taken from "The Last Hero".

Track listing
French track titles from the first 1989 edition / Russian track names from subsequent Russian releases

Side A
 "Changement" / "Хочу Перемен" — 5:00
 "Train de Banlieue" / "Электричка" — 4:51
 "Guerre" / "Война" — 4:06
 "Trolleybus" / "Троллейбус" — 2:56
 "D'ou Vient Donc Cette Tristesse" / "Печаль" — 5:14

Side B
 "Le Dernier Des Héros" / "Последний Герой" — 3:06
 "Groupe Sanguin" / "Группа Крови" — 4:04
 "Maman" / "Мама" — 3:53
 "Dans Nos Yeux" / "В Наших Глазах" — 3:49
 "Bonne Nuit" / "Спокойной Ночи" — 6:29

References 

Kino (band) albums
1989 albums
1989 in the Soviet Union
Soviet rock music